Barmati Panth is a religious tradition founded by Dhani Matang Dev around 1100 CE. The term Barmati means four direction and eight corners joined to form twelve (bar in gujarati, kutchi) Barmati Panth. The Barmati Panth was founded on peak of karumbha dungar (Mountain range in palitana, gujarat later through scriptures of Matang dev founded by their heirs and won in legal battle on the basis of Jain scriptures which itself named is at Matang caves) On peak of karumbha dungar a Narvadh yagna was performed to establish Barmati pant. Its followers are spread in Kutch (now in Gujarat, India) and Sindh (now in Pakistan).

See also
 Satpanth
 Panchorath Yuga
 Mamaidev

References

Indian religions
Sufi organizations
Religious syncretism